Yergyunyag is a rural locality (a selo) in Dzhuldzhagsky Selsoviet, Tabasaransky District, Republic of Dagestan, Russia. The population was 62 as of 2010.

Geography 
Yergyunyag is located 10 km northwest of Khuchni (the district's administrative centre) by road. Yurgulig is the nearest rural locality.

References 

Rural localities in Tabasaransky District